Valeriophonus is a monotypic genus of Thelyphonid whip scorpions, first described by Víquez and Armas in 2005. Its single species, Valeriophonus nara is distributed in Costa Rica.

References 

Arachnid genera
Monotypic arachnid genera
Uropygi